William Henry Locke was a chaplain for the Union during the American Civil War. In his book, The Story of the Regiment, he told the story of the 11th Pennsylvania Infantry Regiment.

External links
The Story of the Regiment on The Library of Congress

Year of birth missing
Year of death missing
Union Army chaplains
American male writers
19th-century American clergy